Jadeworld can refer to Chinese programming available in:  

 Jadeworld (Australia)
 Jadeworld (USA)

TVB